Sauce is a town in Corrientes Province, Argentina. It is the capital of Sauce Department. It is separated from Entre Ríos Province by the Guayquiraró River.

See also

Sauce (disambiguation)

External links

 Municipal website

Populated places in Corrientes Province
Cities in Argentina
Corrientes Province
Argentina